Mauro Jesús Maureira Maureira (born 1 June 2001) is an Argentinian-born, Chilean footballer who plays as a midfielder for Unión Española.

Career statistics

Club

Notes

References

2000 births
Living people
Naturalized citizens of Chile
Chilean footballers
Argentine footballers
Association football midfielders
Unión Española footballers
Chilean Primera División players
Sportspeople from Mendoza, Argentina